Jorge Luis Campos Velázquez (born 11 August 1970) is a Paraguayan former professional footballer who played as an attacking midfielder.

International career
Campos made his international debut for the Paraguay national football team on 14 May 1995 in a Copa Paz de Chico match against Bolivia (1–1). He obtained a total number of 46 international caps, scoring six goals for the national side. He represented Paraguay at the World Cups in 1998 and 2002.

Honours

Club
Universidad Católica
 Primera División de Chile (1): 2002 Apertura

References

External links
 
 
 
 
 

1970 births
Living people
Sportspeople from Asunción
Association football midfielders
Paraguayan footballers
Club Olimpia footballers
Club Deportivo Universidad Católica footballers
Quilmes Atlético Club footballers
Cruz Azul footballers
Club Libertad footballers
Club Nacional footballers
Paraguay international footballers
Chilean Primera División players
1998 FIFA World Cup players
2002 FIFA World Cup players
1995 Copa América players
Beijing Guoan F.C. players
Footballers at the 1992 Summer Olympics
Olympic footballers of Paraguay
Expatriate footballers in Chile
Expatriate footballers in China
Paraguayan expatriates in Chile
Paraguayan expatriates in China
Club Sol de América managers